Ettore Bortolotti (6 March 1866 – 17 February 1947) was an Italian mathematician.

Biography
Bortolotti was born in Bologna. He studied mathematics under Salvatore Pincherle and Cesare Arzelà in Bologna. He graduated in mathematics in 1889 at the University of Bologna, under Pincherle. He was appointed as lecturer to the Lyceum of Modica in Sicily in 1891, then studied one year in Paris as a post-graduate, before lecturing at the University of Rome in 1893.

In 1900, he became professor for infinitesimal calculus at Modena. There, he became dean from 1913 to 1919, then moved back to the University of Bologna, where he retired in 1936.

He was an Invited Speaker of the ICM in 1924 in Toronto and in 1928 in Bologna.

Bortolotti must also be considered a differential geometer and a relativist too. In fact, in the year 1929, he commented on the geometric basis for Einstein’s absolute parallelism theory in a paper entitled "Stars of congruences and absolute parallelism: Geometric basis for a recent theory of Einstein".

His son Enea was a mathematician too. Bortolotti died in Bologna.

Selected works 
 On metric connections with absolute parallelism, Proc. Kon. Akad. Wet. Amsterdam 30 (1927), 216-218.
 Reti di Cebiceff e sistemi coniugati nelle Vn riemanniane, Rend. Reale Acc. dei Lincei (6a) 5 (1927), 741-747.
 Stelle di congruenze e parallelismo assoluto: basi geometriche di una recente teoria di Einstein, Rend. Reale Acc. dei Lincei 9 (1929), 530-538.
 I primi algoritmi infiniti nelle opere dei matematici italiani del secolo XVII (1939)
 L'Opera geometrica di Evangelista Torricelli (1939)
 Le fonti della matematica moderna. Matematica sumerica e matematica babilonese (1940)
 Influenza del campo numerico sullo sviluppo delle teorie algebriche (1941)
 Il carteggio matematico di Giovanni Regiomontano con Giovanni Bianchini, Giacomo Speier e Cristiano Roder (1942)
 La pubblicazione delle opere e del carteggio matematico di Paolo Ruffini (1943)
 Il problema della tangente nell'opera geometrica di Evangelista Torricelli (1943)
 Le serie divergenti nel carteggio matematico di Paolo Ruffini (1944)
 Il carteggio matematico di Paolo Ruffini (1947)

Notes

External links 

 
 An Italian biographical note of Ettore Bortolotti in Archivio storico dell'Università di Bologna 
An Italian short biography of Ettore Bortolotti in Edizione Nazionale Mathematica Italiana online.

1866 births
1947 deaths
Scientists from Bologna
Italian historians of mathematics
Differential geometers
Italian relativity theorists